Flemings Landing is an unincorporated community in New Castle County, Delaware, United States. Flemings Landing is located along Delaware Route 9 just north of the Smyrna River and the Kent County line, to the northeast of Smyrna.

References

Unincorporated communities in New Castle County, Delaware
Unincorporated communities in Delaware